There have been two baronetcies created for persons with the surname Brodie, both in the Baronetage of the United Kingdom.

The Brodie Baronetcy, of Boxford in the County of Suffolk, was created in the Baronetage of the United Kingdom on 30 August 1834 for the noted physiologist and surgeon Benjamin Collins Brodie. He was succeeded by his eldest son, the second Baronet. He was Waynflete Professor of Chemistry at the University of Oxford from 1855 to 1872. His son, the third Baronet, was a Justice of the Peace, Deputy Lieutenant and High Sheriff for Surrey. As of 2007 the title is believed to be held by the latter's grandson, the presumed fifth Baronet, who succeeded his father in 1971. However, he has not successfully proven his succession and is therefore not on the Official Roll of the Baronetage, with the baronetcy considered dormant.

The Brodie Baronetcy, of Idvies in the County of Forfar, was created in the Baronetage of the United Kingdom on 28 March 1892 for Thomas Dawson Brodie. The title became extinct on his death in 1896.

Brodie baronets, of Boxford (1834)

Sir Benjamin Collins Brodie, 1st Baronet (1783–1862)
Sir Benjamin Collins Brodie, 2nd Baronet (1817–1880)
Sir Benjamin Vincent Sellon Brodie, 3rd Baronet (1862–1938)
Sir Benjamin Collins Brodie, MC and bar, 4th Baronet (1888–1971)
Benjamin David Ross Brodie, presumed 5th Baronet (born 1925)

The presumed heir apparent is Alan Ross Brodie (born 1960), only son of the presumed 5th Baronet.

Brodie baronets, of Idvies (1892)

Sir Thomas Dawson Brodie, FRSE 1st Baronet (1832–1896), Secretary of the Carron Ironworks, Deputy Keeper of the Privy Seal 1869-1874

Notes

References

External links
Genealogy of the Brodies of Idvies 
Genealogy of the Brodies of Boxford 

Baronetcies in the Baronetage of the United Kingdom
Extinct baronetcies in the Baronetage of the United Kingdom